Hazardous energy in occupational safety and health is any source of energy (including electrical, mechanical, thermal, chemical, hydraulic, and pneumatic sources of energy) that "can be hazardous to workers", such as from discharge of stored energy.   Failure to control the unexpected release of energy can lead to machine-related injuries or fatalities.  The risk from these sources of energy can be controlled in a number of ways, including access control procedures such as lockout-tagout.

References

External links 

 Canadian Centre for Occupational Health and Safety, OSH Answers Fact Sheets- Hazardous Energy Control Programs
 Control of Hazardous Energy - Lockout/Tagout. OSHA Publication 3120, (Revised 2002). This booklet presents OSHA's general requirements for controlling hazardous energy during service or maintenance of machines or equipment. It is not intended to replace or to supplement OSHA standards regarding the control of hazardous energy.
 Health and Safety Executive, Electrical safety and you, a brief guide

 Lockout/Tagout. OSHA Fact Sheet, (2002). Also available in Spanish.
 National Occupational Research Agenda- Hazardous Energy Control (Lockout and other means)

Energy sources
Occupational safety and health